Shahi paneer  is a preparation of paneer, native to the Indian subcontinent, consisting of a thick gravy of cream, tomatoes and Indian spices. 

Originating with the creamy delicacies of Mughlai cuisine (hence the term "shahi", in reference to the royal title of Shahanshah in Mughal India), this dish is prepared by emulsifying tomatoes, onions, ground cashews, clarified butter and cream into a curry, with the addition of paneer cubes and a variety of spices.

It is mainly eaten with traditional Indian flat-breads like roti or naan, rice and bread. Paneer is derived from the Persian word for cheese, and shahi is the term for royal (in reference to the Imperial Court of the Mughal Empire).

Similar dishes include paneer butter masala and Kadai paneer. The subtle difference between paneer butter masala and shahi paneer is that more of whole spices are used in paneer butter masala, whereas shahi paneer has a sweeter taste when compared to paneer butter masala.

See also
 Paneer makhani
 List of Indian dishes
 Mughlai cuisine

References

Indian cheese dishes
North Indian cuisine
Punjabi cuisine
Mughlai cuisine
Vegetarian dishes of India